Rachel River is a 1987 comedy-drama film about a young journalist who returns to her Minnesota hometown to reexamine her life. The film was directed by Sandy Smolan, and stars Pamela Reed, Viveca Lindfors, Željko Ivanek, James Olson, and Craig T. Nelson.

Plot

Cast

Production

Shooting completed in November 1986, with post-production completing in August 1987.

The budget was $1.2 million (equivalent to $ million in ), half of which was provided by PBS's American Playhouse. The film was later broadcast on American Playhouse.

Reception

The film won Excellence in Cinematography Award Dramatic and a Special Jury Prize for Acting for Lindfors at the 1988 Sundance Film Festival.

References

External links
 
 
 

1987 films
1987 comedy-drama films
Films shot in Minnesota
American comedy-drama films
1980s English-language films
1980s American films
English-language comedy-drama films